The Invisible Ones is a 1988 Italian drama film  written and directed by Pasquale Squitieri.  It is loosely based on the novel Gli invisibili by Nanni Balestrini.

The film was entered into the main competition at the 45th edition of the Venice Film Festival.

Plot 
At the beginning of the eighties, Sirio, a young worker of the Terni steelworks with a past in student protesting, decides to abandon his job to join an extreme left-wing group. Although he declares himself contrary to the armed struggle following the decision by some elements of the group to carry out terrorist actions, he is arrested upon being caught with his best friend Apache.

Although there is no real evidence of his guilt, Sirio is promised freedom only if he will talk about the organization and his companions. He refuses, and is subsequently transferred to a maximum security prison where he meets some of his companions (including Apache) and the Professor, a far-left philosopher considered the main inspiration of the movement. Life in the special prison seems to be better than in the penitentiary until, following a revolt led by some extreme leftist militants and sedated by the Special Intervention Group of the police, maximum security is re-established.

These events will lead Sirio to estrange himself more and more from reality, until he finally loses contact with the outside world.

Cast 
 
 Alfredo Rotella as Sirio 
 Giulia Fossà as  China 
 Igor Zalewsky as  Apache 
 Victor Cavallo as  Maurizio 
 Paola Rinaldi as  Valeriana 
 Mauro Festa as The Professor 
 Alessandro Zama as  Ortica 
 Daniela Igliozzi as   Sirio's Mother
 Salvatore Billa as  Domenico

References

External links

1988 drama films
1988 films
Films directed by Pasquale Squitieri
Italian drama films
Films about terrorism
1980s Italian-language films
1980s Italian films